Peter Jacobson is an actor.

Peter Jacobson may also refer to:

Peter Marc Jacobson (born 1957), American television writer, director and producer
Peter Jacobson (judge), Federal Court of Australia judge
Peter Jacobson (poet) (1925–1998), New Zealand poet
Pete Jacobson of The Even Dozen Jug Band

See also
Johan Peter Jacobson (1857–?), Norwegian politician
Peter Jacobsen (born 1954), American golfer and commentator